Jean Michel Bassot (born 29 January 1959) is a former professional footballer who played as a midfielder.

External links
Jean Michel Bassot profile at chamoisfc79.fr

1959 births
Living people
French footballers
Association football midfielders
Tours FC players
ASOA Valence players
Chamois Niortais F.C. players
Ligue 1 players
INF Clairefontaine players
Ligue 2 players
People from Vichy
Sportspeople from Allier
Footballers from Auvergne-Rhône-Alpes